The spotted great rosefinch or spotted rosefinch (Carpodacus rubicilla severtzovi) is a finch in the family Fringillidae. It is found in Kashmir, Nepal, Tibet, and southwestern China.

Its natural habitats are tundra and temperate grassland.

It was formerly considered a distinct species, but is now commonly regarded as a subspecies of the great rosefinch.

References

Carpodacus